Follet's Island is a barrier island on the Texas Gulf Coast in Brazoria County, Texas, immediately southwest of Galveston Island. Follet's Island separates the Christmas Bay system from the Gulf of Mexico, making it one of a chain of barrier islands running along most of the Texas coast. Many historians believe that Cabeza de Vaca and his companions from the Narváez expedition landed at what is now Follet's Island. The southwestern tip of the island is occupied by the city of Surfside Beach, Texas.

References

External links
 

Barrier islands of Texas
Landforms of Brazoria County, Texas